Johann Heinrich Boeckler (13 December 1611 in Cronheim – 12 September 1672 in Strassburg) was a German polymath.

Born in Cronheim as a son of the Protestant priest Johann Boeckler and Magda Summer, he was a polymath at the University in Strassburg. He was the brother of the architect Georg Andreas Boeckler who also became famous with his publication Architectura Curiosa Nova. 1649 Queen Christina of Sweden invited Johann Heinrich to teach at the University in Uppsala. In 1650 he was graduated Swedish state historian. In 1654 he returned as a professor to the University of Strassburg.

Publications (selection) 

 Orationes duae. I. de C. Taciti Historia, II. de Tiberii Caesaris principatu. Straßburg 1636
 Historia schola principum. 1640
 In C. Corn. Taciti quinque libros histor. annotatio politica. Straßburg 1648
 Disseratio De Notitia Reipublicae, Ad C: Corn. Taciti lib. IV, 33. Uppsala 1649. (Digitalisat in der Digitalen Bibliothek Mecklenburg-Vorpommern)
 Nomima tōn Aigyptiōn, sive leges Aegyptiorum., 1657
 Iosephus Philonis, sive bios politiku, vita viri civilis., 1660
 In Hugonis Grotii Ius Belli Et Pacis, Ad Illustrißimum Baronem Boineburgium Commentatio Jo. Henrici Boecleri. Straßburg 1663/1664
 Elogium Christophori Forstneri. 1669
 Collegium politicae posthumum. Oder polit. Discourse von 1. Verbesserung Land und Leuth, 2. Anrichtung guter Policey, 3. Erledigung grosser Ausgaaben, und 4. eines jeden Regenten jährlichen Gefäll und Einkommen. Anno (editori Magisteriali) 1669. zu Strassburg von dem weitberühmten JCto, und der Rechten Professore, Hn. J. Heinr. Böcklern, nun aber zu geminem Besten publicè andas Liecht gebracht, und zum Druck befördert. o.O., o.J. [wohl Straßburg 1670]
 Bibliographia historico-politico-philologica curiosa. Leipzig 1677
 Joh. Henrici Boecleri kurtze Anweisung, wie man die Authores classicos bey und mit der Jugend tractiren soll. So auch desselben dissertatio epistolica postrema de Studio politico bene instituendo. Straßburg 1680
 Institutiones politicae. 1704
 Joh. Heinrici Boecleri Viri Celeberrimi Libellus Memorialis Ethicus, 1712
 Theses Juridicae de testamentis solemnibus et minus solemnibus. 1720

External links

 
 Entry at Kalliope

17th-century German jurists
German literary historians
1611 births
1672 deaths
University of Strasbourg alumni
Academic staff of the University of Strasbourg
Academic staff of Uppsala University